Style Network (known on air as Style) was an Australian pay television channel that owned by Universal Networks International. It was a domestic version of the American Style Network (which it outlasted by six years after that network was converted to the short-lived men's interest Esquire Network), and much like its American counterpart it featured fashion, design, and programming for women.

It was available through the Foxtel and FetchTV platforms. In 2014, it became available on Australian streaming service Foxtel Play.

History
Style was launched on the Foxtel and Austar platforms on 15 November 2009. The channel abruptly ceased broadcasting on 17 December 2019, after Foxtel changed around their lineup and UNI decided to consolidate programming on several networks, also ending operations of 13th Street and Syfy at the end of 2019.

Programming

Original local programming
Fashion Bloggers (season 1 only, season 2 aired on sister channel E!)

Acquired programming from American Style Network

Big Rich Texas
Celebrity Closet Confidential
Clean House
Fashion Hunters
Girl Meets Gown
Jerseylicious
Little Women: LA
Pregnant and Dating
Ruby
Styled to Rock
The Amandas
The Jennie Garth Project

Acquired programming from other networks

Bringing Sexy Back
Double Divas
How'd You Get So Rich?
The Good Buy Girls

See also
Esquire Network, formerly the American version of the Style Network

References

Defunct television channels in Australia
English-language television stations in Australia
Television channels and stations established in 2009
Television channels and stations disestablished in 2019
Fashion-related television channels